A referendum on building an approach road for an industrial zone in Schaan was held in Liechtenstein on 14 March 2010. The proposal was approved by 52% of voters.

Background
On 18 November 2009 the Landtag voted 18–7 to spend 15 million francs on an approach road for an industrial zone in Schaan. The road would be 1.4km long, although 75% of the route was already roadway. A separate cycle and pedestrian path would also be created alongside the road.

The Free List and Transport Club Liechtenstein (VCL) believed it to be the first step in attempts to build a bypass and started an attempt to force a referendum. Between 29 November and 23 December they collected 1,257 signatures, surpassing the requirement of 1,000 in article 66 of the constitution.

Results
Due to an error in the count, the reported total number of votes was lower than the sum of the valid and invalid votes.

References

Referendums in Liechtenstein
Approach
Liechtenstein
Liechtenstein